Morgan Connor was an officer in the Continental Army who served as Adjutant General in 1777.

See also
List of Adjutant Generals of the U.S. Army
List of people who disappeared mysteriously at sea

External links

1780 deaths
1780s missing person cases
18th-century Irish people
Adjutants general of the United States Army
Continental Army officers from Pennsylvania
Continental Army officers from Ireland
Irish emigrants to the United States (before 1923)
Kingdom of Ireland emigrants to the Thirteen Colonies
Pennsylvania militiamen in the American Revolution
People from County Kerry
People lost at sea
Year of birth unknown